Rosa 'Royal Highness' is a light pink hybrid tea rose cultivar. Bred by Herbert Swim and Weeks Rose Growers in 1961, the rose was named an All-America Rose Selections winner in 1963. The rose was introduced into the United States by Star Roses in 1962. The stock parents are the hybrid tea roses, 'Virgo' and 'Mme A. Meilland' ('Peace').

Description
'Royal Highness' is a medium-tall upright shrub, 4 to 6 ft (121-182 cm) in height with a 2 to 3 ft (60-91 cm) spread. Blooms are 4-5  in (10-12  cm) in diameter, with 40 to 45 petals. The rose has a strong and sweet fragrance.  

The petals "are creamy white with pink undersides, and the exquisite shade of palest pink comes from the shadows that form  between the opening petals."  Blooms are large, high-centered, very full and grow singly on long stems. The petals fall apart quickly in rain. The buds are long and pointed in form. The plant does best in hot climates. The leaves are large, glossy, dark green and leathery. The plant is  disease resistant and grows best in USDA zone 6b and warmer.

Child plants
Rosa 'Shinju'(1976)

Awards
 Portland Gold Medal Award (1961)
 Madrid Gold Medal (1962)
 All-America Rose Selections winner, USA, (1963)

See also
Garden roses
Rose Hall of Fame
List of Award of Garden Merit roses

Notes

References

Royal Highness
Products introduced in 1962